The 1986 Virginia Slims of Washington, also known as the VS of Washington, was a women's tennis tournament played on indoor carpet courts at the GWU Charles Smith Center in Washington, D.C. in the United States that was part of the 1985 Virginia Slims World Championship Series. It was the 15th edition of the tournament and was played from January 6 through January 13, 1986. First-seeded Martina Navratilova won the singles title.

Finals

Singles
 Martina Navratilova defeated  Pam Shriver 6–1, 6–4

Doubles
 Martina Navratilova /  Pam Shriver defeated  Claudia Kohde-Kilsch /  Helena Suková 6–3, 6–4

Notes

References

External links
 ITF tournament edition details

Virginia Slims of Washington
Virginia Slims Of Washington, 1986
1986 in Washington, D.C.